Napier may refer to:

People
 Napier (surname), including a list of people with that name
 Napier baronets, five baronetcies and lists of the title holders

Given name
 Napier Shaw (1854–1945), British meteorologist
 Napier Waller (1893–1972), Australian muralist, mosaicist and painter

Places

Antarctica
 Napier Island, in Marguerite Bay, on the Fallières Coast
 Napier Mountains, in Enderby Land, East Antarctica
 Napier Peak, in the South Shetland Islands, Western Antarctica
 Napier Rock, in Admiralty Bay, King George Island, South Shetland Islands

Australia
 Mount Napier, a dormant volcano in Victoria
 Napier Range, a mountain range in Western Australia
 Napier County, New South Wales
 Napier, New South Wales, a locality in the Riverina region
 Electoral district of Napier, a former electoran district in South Australia

Canada
 Napier, Ontario, an unincorporated place in Middlesex County
 Napier Bay, an Arctic waterway in Qikiqtaaluk Region, Nunavut

India
 Napier Bay Islands, in the Andaman Islands, South Andaman

New Zealand
 Napier, New Zealand, a city
 Napier (New Zealand electorate), a parliamentary electorate

Singapore
Napier MRT station, an MRT station as part of the Thomson-East Coast Line in Singapore

South Africa
 Napier, Western Cape, a village in Overberg, Western Cape

United States
 Napier, Missouri, a ghost town in Holt County
 Napier Township, Bedford County, Pennsylvania
 Napier, West Virginia, an unincorporated community in Braxton County

Other uses
 Napier (company), Canadian developer and distributor of vehicle camping tents
 Napier Company (jewellery), American jewellery company
 D. Napier & Son, a British engineering company
 Robert Napier and Sons, a former Clydeside shipbuilder
 HMS Napier, a list of ships with this name
 7096 Napier, a Mars-orbit crossing asteroid
 Edinburgh Napier University, Scotland (original name Napier Technical College)

See also
Grant Napear, American sportscaster with a similarly spelled surname
Neper, a unit of measurement